Pilot jacket may refer to:

 A-2 jacket, associated with U.S. Army pilots of World War II
 Cooper A-2 jacket, a type of leather jacket used by the U.S. Air Force in World War II
 Flight jacket, the umbrella term for any jacket used by pilot or in the style of such
 MA-1 bomber jacket, developed for use in high-altitude jets, and very popular as civilian adaptations
 Pea coat, the heavy wool overcoat traditionally worn as a navy uniform worldwide